The 2021 leadership election for the International Brotherhood of Teamsters, also known as the Teamsters Union, occurred after General President James P. Hoffa announced his retirement.  Ballots were mailed to eligible members of the union on October 4, 2021 and counting of the ballots began on November 15, 2021.  On November 19, 2021, Sean O'Brien of the Teamsters United slate was declared the winner.

The election was contested by two slates, Teamsters United and Teamster Power.  The Teamsters United slate, led by O’Brien (of Local 25 in Boston) and Fred Zuckerman of Local 89 in Louisville, is aligned with a reform movement within the Teamsters Union.  Teamster Power, by Steve Vairma of Local 455 in Denver and Ron Herrera of Local 396 in Los Angeles, was endorsed by and more closely affiliated with Hoffa.  Some of the same groups behind Teamsters United ran a slate in 2016 that narrowly lost to Hoffa.

The 2021 Teamsters election was the first in 25 years in which Hoffa did not run.  The internal rank and file organization Teamsters for a Democratic Union campaigned in favor of Teamsters United, on the basis of dissatisfaction around issues including contract negotiations and pension arrangements.  The winning Teamsters United slate has been associated with a younger, more militant generation of labor leadership that has been gaining in organization and popularity in some industries in the United States.

References 

International Brotherhood of Teamsters
2021 elections in North America